The A83 is a major road in the south of Argyll and Bute, Scotland, running from Tarbet, on the western shore of Loch Lomond, where it splits from the A82, to Campbeltown at the southern end of the Kintyre peninsula.

Route

From Tarbet the A83 runs west across the watershed between Loch Lomond and Loch Long to Arrochar near the head of Loch Long.  It then goes round the head of the loch, and along the western shore for a short distance, before turning NW through the Rest and be Thankful mountain pass through Glen Croe in the Arrochar Alps, from the shore of Loch Long to that of Loch Fyne. It was near this spot that an RAF Tornado crashed on 2 July 2009.

The words REST & BE THANKFUL are inscribed on a stone near the junction of the A83 and the B828, placed there by soldiers who built the original military road in 1753, now referred to as the Drovers' Road. The original stone fell into ruin and was replaced by a commemorative stone at the same site.

The section is so named as the climb out of Glen Croe is so long and steep at the end that it was customary for travellers to rest at the top, and be thankful for having reached the highest point. The current road no longer keeps to the floor of Glen Croe but steadily climbs across the southern slopes of Beinn Luibhean, on the north side of the Glen, to the highest point of the pass. The westward descent to Loch Fyne is through Glen Kinglas.  At Cairndow the A815, the main road down the Cowal peninsula, branches off south to Dunoon and finally Toward at the A815 road end, both on the Firth of Clyde.

On reaching the shore of Loch Fyne, the A83 follows the eastern shore of the loch northwards to its head and then goes south west along the western shore through Inveraray and then on to Lochgilphead and Ardrishaig, where it crosses the entrance to the Crinan Canal.

From Ardrishaig the road continues south to Tarbert, where it crosses over to the western shore of the Kintyre peninsula. In the final section it passes through the villages of Whitehouse, Clachan, Tayinloan, Muasdale and Bellochantuy before finally crossing back to the east of the peninsula, on the Firth of Clyde coast, as it approaches Campbeltown.

Rest and Be Thankful closures
The stretch south of the Rest and Be Thankful junction has been closed on a number of occasions due to landslides, causing significant disruption to local traffic. The closure results in a 59-mile (93 km) diversion via Crianlarich when the military road is also affected. The many communities affected by the closures of the trunk road are campaigning for a permanent solution to be constructed by Transport Scotland. Suggestions include a rock shed, so future slips flow over the trunk road, and a new road route.

Transport Scotland has, in recent years, spent £80m on landslip prevention schemes, none of which has improved the situation on the trunk road.  The many wire slip capture nets and supporting cables have failed on many occasions and some have criticised these, saying they blight the picturesque area.

 The trunk road was closed here due to a 400 tonne landslide on 28 October 2007. The road was partially reopened on Monday 10 November.
 A 1,070 tonne landslide closed the trunk road around noon on 8 September 2009. The road reopened at 15.00 on 10 September 2009.
 A landslip on 1 December 2011 closed the trunk road for 24 hours.
 Another landslip closed the trunk road from 22 February 2012, and an even more substantial landslip in August 2012 resulted in further major delays and closures.
 On 3 October 2013, the trunk road was reopened at 17.30, having been closed between the A815 and the B828 since the previous night.
 On 30 December 2015, Storm Frank caused a 200 tonne landslide; two cars were caught up in the debris but no one was harmed. The trunk road reopened the following afternoon.
 The A83 trunk road closed again for a period of nine days in October 2018, in response to landslides triggered during the start of Storm Callum.
 In August 2020 a landslip happened as the area experienced heavy rains, again closing the trunk road.
 In September 2020, after being re-opened for only five days, a further landslip happened as the area again experienced heavy rains, closing the trunk road.

Landslides have become increasingly frequent in recent years despite remediation efforts. In March 2020 Transport Scotland said it was investing in the further construction of catch pits which it hoped would mitigate against landslides along the A83 trunk road route. A 10-year woodland creation project is currently in progress; it is thought that the subsequent ground stabilisation will help prevent further landslides.

In March 2022, Transport Scotland shortlisted five consultants to design a long-term solution to landslip problems on the A83 at Rest and Be Thankful. Five options including tunnelling are being considered. Transport Scotland has looked at Norway's processes and methods for developing and constructing tunnelling projects to deal with conditions similar to those at Rest and Be Thankful.

References

External links
2007 Rest and Be Thankful Landslide, British Geological Survey
2009 Rest and Be Thankful Landslide, British Geological Survey

Roads in Scotland
Transport in Argyll and Bute
Transport in West Dunbartonshire
Mountain passes of Scotland
Cowal